Robert Montovio (born 3 August 1984) is a Gibraltarian footballer who plays as a forward for Mons Calpe.

International career
He made his debut for the Gibraltar national football team on 23 March 2016, as an 81st-minute substitute for Lee Casciaro in a goalless draw against Liechtenstein at the Victoria Stadium.

Coaching and futsal
Upon joining Gibraltar United in 2015, Montovio became a youth coach at the club, a role he continued until the club folded despite leaving the team as a player in 2017.

References

External links

1984 births
Living people
Gibraltarian footballers
Association football forwards
Gibraltar international footballers
Europa F.C. players
Europa Point F.C. players
F.C. Olympique 13 players
Glacis United F.C. players
Gibraltar United F.C. players
Leo F.C. players
Manchester 62 F.C. players
Mons Calpe S.C. players
Gibraltar Premier Division players
Gibraltar National League players